Trent Bridge is a cricket ground in Nottingham, England, it was established in 1841 and has a capacity of 17,500. The ground hosted its first Test match in 1899 when England played Australia, One Day Internationals (ODIs) have been played at the ground since 1974. There have been 110 Test centuries, 26 ODI centuries and a T20I century that have been scored at the ground.

The first Test century at the ground was made by the Englishman Archie MacLaren in 1905, MacLaren scored 140 against Australia. Another Englishman, Denis Compton, holds the record for the highest Test innings at the ground, Compton's innings of 278 was scored against Pakistan in 1954. Compton is one of only two players to have scored 5 Test centuries at the ground, the other is Mike Atherton. The highest Test innings by an overseas player is 261 which was scored by the West Indian Frank Worrell in 1950.

The Englishman David Lloyd scored the first ODI century at Trent Bridge when he made 116 not out against Pakistan in 1974. Alex Hales's innings of 171 from 122 balls, made against Pakistan in 2016, is the highest ODI score seen at Trent Bridge. Allan Lamb is one of two players alongside Alex Hales to have scored two ODI centuries at the ground.

England's Liam Livingstone and India's Suryakumar Yadav are the only two players to score T20I centuries at the stadium.

Key
 * denotes that the batsman was not out.
 Inns. denotes the number of the innings in the match.
 Balls denotes the number of balls faced in an innings.
 NR denotes that the number of balls was not recorded.
 Parentheses next to the player's score denotes his century number at Trent Bridge.
 The column title Date refers to the date the match started.
 The column title Result refers to whether the player's team won, lost or if the match was drawn or tied.

List of centuries

Test centuries
The following table summarises the Test centuries scored at Trent Bridge.

One Day International centuries
The following table summarises the One Day International centuries scored at Trent Bridge.

T20 International centuries
The following table summarises the T20 International centuries scored at Trent Bridge.

References 

Trent Bridge
Cricket in Nottinghamshire
Centuries
Centuries